Jeremy Morriss is a New Zealand Paralympic boccia player. He was a bronze medallist at the 2004 Summer Paralympics. He also competed at the 2008 Summer Paralympics.

References

External links 
 
 

Living people
Paralympic boccia players of New Zealand
Boccia players at the 2004 Summer Paralympics
Boccia players at the 2008 Summer Paralympics
Paralympic medalists in boccia
Paralympic silver medalists for New Zealand
Year of birth missing (living people)